Móu is a Chinese surname.

Notable people
 Mou Zongsan (pinyin: Móu Zōngsān; Wade–Giles: Mou Tsung-san, 1909–1995), Chinese New Confucian philosopher
 Mou Tun-fei (May 3, 1941 - May 25, 2019), Chinese filmmaker
 Mou Shantao, Chinese footballer

Individual Chinese surnames